Campagna Motors, was founded in 1988 in the Province of Quebec, Canada. Campagna has acquired a reputation within the automotive industry since the development of the first T-Rex prototype in 1994. Campagna's founder Daniel Campagna devoted more than eight years to the creation of the T-Rex, personally handcrafting the first vehicles. Since then, Campagna has gathered a creative team of technicians carrying the mission, the vision and the T-Rex heritage.

Campagna in Italian means "countryside".

As of 20 January 2019, it was announced by President Andre Morrisette via social media that Campagna Motors is officially closed due to bankruptcy.

After a short break, On 28 February 2019, Campagna Motors announced via social media that they have new investors and will be restarting production and sales. Vehicle delivery is scheduled for June/July 2019.

History
In 1976, 1977 and 1979, Daniel Campagna is a Formula 1 Ford Team racer in Quebec. He made some significant inventions, including the Voodoo; an off-road racer, in 1982. He hands built a first model of the T-REX® in 1988, the Concept 3, and then founded his own company, Campagna Moto Sport Inc. In 1990, he brought together a team and completed a first model of the vehicle a few years later which was showcase at the 1994 edition of the Montreal Auto Show at the Olympic Stadium.

From 1994 to 2000, the T-REX® was only available in the Province of Quebec. Since the early 2000s, they are being sold all over the world but mostly in the USA. In June 2004, the company Campagna Moto Sport was facing financial difficulties and granted exclusive worldwide manufacturing and sales license of T-REX® through T-REX Vehicles Inc.

In spring 2008, T-REX Vehicles Inc. declared bankruptcy. The assets of the company were redeemed later the same year by André Morissette and David Neault, who formed Campagna Motors.

In January 2009, Campagna Motors announced the relocation of its Plessisville plant to Boucherville, particularly to get closer to Montreal.

Since July 2009, the company has around 25 employees producing two to three vehicles per week.

The V13R was introduced in 2011. Even though it's a trike like the T-REX, its styling is different, and it has a V-ROD engine from Harley-Davidson.

Since 2013, Campagna has a long-term strategic agreement with the BMW Group that allows them to use the 1649cc engine BMW© in-line 6 cylinders in their T-REX®.

On April 4, 2018, an electric prototype was released; based on the original T-REX but featuring the electric powertrain of Zero Motorcycle. The Electric T-Rex was used to see if an electric motor would be viable and appeal to the customer base. Campagna Motors believed there is a demand, and will continue to work on making an electric T-Rex a production model in the future. 

After a brief break at the beginning of 2019 Campagna Motors has reemerged under new ownership and as of April 2019 production as restarted in the Boucherville, QC factory. New vehicles are expected to be completed and delivered to their dealers in early summer 2019.

Models

Current
 Campagna T-Rex - a two-seat, three-wheeled cyclecar utilizing a BMW engine.
 Campagna V13R - a two-seat, three-wheeled cyclecar utilizing a 122 hp Harley-Davidson Revolution engine.

Former
 Campagna Motors TR Thunder

Media

The T-REX was featured on the show How It's Made.

Jay Leno's Garage

See also
Aero 3S

References

External links
Official website

Motorcycle manufacturers of Canada
Vehicle manufacturing companies established in 1988
Companies based in Boucherville
Manufacturing companies based in Quebec